Saint-André-Farivillers is a commune in the Oise department in northern France.

Sites and monuments 
Saint-André Church (16th century) : isolated structure in the middle of the plain, at the junction of four hamlets which constitute the commune. The Renaissance style choir was built in 1555, the Gothic nave is lower. It has been listed since 1992 as a monument historique by the French Ministry of Culture. Three stained glass windows, damaged by a hail storm, were restored in 2016. The church still has a window from 1572, a bell from 1693 and an 18th-century altar.

See also
 Communes of the Oise department

References

External links
 

Communes of Oise